Hinzert-Pölert is a municipality in the Trier-Saarburg district, in Rhineland-Palatinate, Germany. Just west of the village lies the former concentration camp Hinzert

References

Municipalities in Rhineland-Palatinate
Trier-Saarburg